New Gascony is an unincorporated community in Bogy township, Jefferson county, Arkansas,  west of Pine Bluff, the county seat. It was founded by French Peninsular War veteran and Indian trader Antoine Barraque on November 29, 1832, and named for the Gascony region of France.

Education
It is a part of the Pine Bluff School District. The schools serving New Gascony are Park/Greenville School for preschool, James Matthews Elementary School, Robert F. Morehead Middle School, and Dollarway High School.

New Gascony was previously in the Altheimer School District. The Altheimer-Sherrill district was created in 1979 when the Altheimer and Sherrill districts merged. In 1993, that merged into the Altheimer Unified School District (operator of Altheimer-Sherrill High School). That district merged into the Dollarway School District on July 10, 2006. Altheimer-Sherrill High closed in 2007, with students moved to Dollarway High. Altheimer Martin Elementary School closed in 2013.

In December 2020 the Arkansas State Board of Education ruled that the Dollarway School District should merge into the Pine Bluff School District as of July 1, 2021; the post-merger school district began operating all existing schools from both districts. Accordingly, the attendance boundary maps of the respective schools remained the same for the 2021–2022 school year, and all DSD territory became a part of the PBSD territory. The exception was with the pre-kindergarten levels, as all PBSD areas are now assigned to Forrest Park/Greenville School, including the territory from the former Dollarway district. In 2023 the district announced that Dollarway High would merge into Pine Bluff High School, and that Morehead Middle School would become the only middle school for all of the Pine Bluff School District.

See also  
List of place names of French origin in the United States
National Register of Historic Places listings in Jefferson County, Arkansas

References

Further reading 

1832 establishments in Arkansas Territory
Arkansas populated places on the Arkansas River
Brooks–Baxter War
Former county seats in Arkansas
Populated places established in 1832
Trading posts in the United States
Unincorporated communities in Jefferson County, Arkansas